Muhlenberg Greene Architects, Ltd. is a full-service architecture firm, in continuous operation since 1920, and was one of the predominant architecture/engineering firms in Reading, Pennsylvania, during the first half of the 20th century.

Muhlenberg Greene Architects  was originally established in 1920 as Frederick A. Muhlenberg, Registered Architect.  Since its founding, Muhlenberg Greene Architects lists over 3,500 commissions to its credit, including many landmarks in the city of Reading, such as Berks Heim, the Reading Medical Arts Building, and Stokesay Castle.

Founder 

The original founder of Muhlenberg Greene Architects, Frederick Augustus Muhlenberg II, FAIA was renowned for his endeavors in architecture, politics, community, social services, and the military.  Although Frederick Muhlenberg opened an office in Philadelphia around 1917-1919, by 1920, the practice was located exclusively in Reading, and the firm continued through several reorganizations to its present form as Muhlenberg Greene Architects, Ltd.

Frederick A. Muhlenberg, Registered Architect,  1920–1930

Muhlenberg, Yerkes, Muhlenberg,  1930 – 1957
(Partners were Frederick A. Muhlenberg, Simeon M. Yerkes, Charles Rick Muhlenberg (died 7/15/1953), and Frederick H. Muhlenberg.

Muhlenberg and Yerkes Associates,  1957 – 1959

Frederick A. Muhlenberg & Associates,  1959 – 1965

Muhlenberg-Greene-Veres,  1965 – 1972
(Partners were Frederick A. Muhlenberg, Lawrence A. Greene, Jr. and Elmer Veres)

Muhlenberg-Greene Architects,  1972 – 1977
(Partners were Frederick A. Muhlenberg and Lawrence A. Greene, Jr.)

Muhlenberg-Greene Architects, 1977-1980
(Lawrence A. Greene, Jr., Sole Proprietor)

Muhlenberg Greene Architects, Ltd.,  1980 – Present

Frequently confused with the Muhlenberg Brothers, an architecture/engineering firm also operating in Reading, Pennsylvania during the first half of the 20th century, Muhlenberg Greene Architects was never affiliated with Muhlenberg Brothers’ firm, although Frederick Muhlenberg does have familial ties with the Brothers.

Officially retiring from the firm in 1977,  one week after his 90th birthday, Mr. Muhlenberg still came to the office daily until physical limitations prevented him from doing so about a year later.  Fred Muhlenberg died on January 19, 1980, at 92 years of age.

Present organization 

Following Mr. Muhlenberg's retirement in 1977, the Firm became the sole proprietorship of Lawrence A. Greene, Jr, (who had, at that time, been a partner of the firm for 25 years) until January 1, 1980 when the present corporation, Muhlenberg Greene Architects, Ltd., was established.  The original principals/stockholders were Lawrence (Larry) A. Greene, Howard Quaintance, and James (Jim) E. Dockey.  In 1983, Dennis W. Rex was added as a principal/stockholder of the Firm.  In 1998, John R. Hill became a principal/stockholder.  The current principals are Larry Greene, Howard Quaintance, Dennis W. Rex, and John R. Hill.  Muhlenberg Greene Architects, Ltd. is a member of the American Institute of Architects and the U.S. Green Building Council,  and many of the staff are LEED Accredited Professionals.

Selected projects 

Pennsylvania Optical Company, 1916
Chantrell Tool, 1922
Alterations to Pomeroy's Department Store, Reading, Pennsylvania, 1922-1968
The Harold Furniture Company, 726 Penn Street, Reading, Pennsylvania, 1923
Industrial extensions to Carpenter Steel Company, 1923-1950
Penn Hardware, 1924, 1942
Twelfth street surgical wing of St. Joseph's Hospital, Reading, Pennsylvania, South wing 1926
Croll and Keck, Reading, Pennsylvania, 1927
Annex to the Wyomissing Club, 1929
Reed Street addition to YMCA, Reading, Pennsylvania. Multiple projects for YMCA of Reading, 1929-2000
Medical Arts Building, 230 North Fifth Street, Reading, Pennsylvania, 2 Jan 1931
Stokesay Castle, Reading, Pennsylvania, built 1932,  renovated 2009
Additions to Whitner's, Reading, Pennsylvania, 1941, 1953
Berks Heim, Bern Township, Pennsylvania, 1954, Annex 1974
New Science Building, Kutztown State Teachers College, Kutztown, Pennsylvania, 1959
Episcopal House Apartments, 9th and Washington Streets, Reading, Pennsylvania, 1972
Penn Square Center, Reading, Pennsylvania, 1978
Madison Building, Fourth and Washington Streets, Reading, Pennsylvania, 1984
Reading City Hall addition and renovation, Reading, Pennsylvania, 1994
Reading Eagle Press Hall Addition, Reading, Pennsylvania, 2009
Read's Department Store, Reading, Pennsylvania
Two Reading Public Library branches, Reading, Pennsylvania
American Bank buildings, Reading, Pennsylvania
Four Reading School District Buildings, Reading, Pennsylvania
Community General Hospital, Reading, Pennsylvania
Western Electric main plant, Reading, Pennsylvania
Addition to Bell Telephone Company, Lancaster, Pennsylvania
General Battery Corp., Reading, Pennsylvania
CNA Insurance, Reading, Pennsylvania
Reading-Muhlenberg Vo-Tech, Muhlenberg Township, Pennsylvania 
Carole & Ray Neag Center, Children's Home of Reading, Reading, Pennsylvania, 2003
C.E. Cole Intermediate School, Muhlenberg School District, Laureldale, Pennsylvania, 2008
Utilities Employees Credit Union, Wyomissing, Pennsylvania, 2010

Other clients 

American Chain & Cable Co.
The Glidden Company
Polymer Corporation
Ready, Pratt and Cady

See also 
 Frederick A. Muhlenberg
 Muhlenberg family
 Muhlenberg
 Reading, Pennsylvania
 Berks County, Pennsylvania
 George Baer Hiester
 Medical Arts Building (Reading, Pennsylvania)

References

External links 
History - Muhlenberg Greene Architects, Muhlenberg Greene Architects, Ltd.
The Athenaeum of Philadelphia, "Muhlenberg, Frederick Augustus (1887 - 1980)", Philadelphia Architects and Buildings
Frederick Augustus Muhlenberg at ArlingtonCemetery.net, an unofficial website
Muhlenberg Greene Architects Ltd. Reading Eagle Business Weekly.
Muhlenberg/Greene Architects, Ltd. (M/GA), Reading, Pennsylvania, USA. Archiplanet.
Facebook - Muhlenberg Greene Architects.  Facebook.

Architecture firms of the United States
Architecture firms based in Pennsylvania
Companies based in Berks County, Pennsylvania
American companies established in 1920
Design companies established in 1920
1920 establishments in Pennsylvania